Krista is a female given name, a mostly North European (Finland, Estonia and Sweden) variant of the male name Christian. The name Krista can be spelled with a "Ch", making it Christa. It means "Follower of Christ".

People named Krista
Krista Allen (born 1971), American actress
Krista Aru (born 1958), Estonian historian, museologist and politician
Krista Benjamin (born 1970), American poet
Krista Blunk, American sports analyst 
Krista Branch, American singer
Krista Bridge, Canadian writer
Krista Bridges (born 1968), Canadian actress
Krista Buecking (born 1982), Canadian visual artist
Krista Davey (born 1978), American soccer player
Krista Detor (born 1969), American singer
Krista Donnenwirth (born 1989), American softball player
Krista Donaldson (born 1973), Canadian-American engineer
Krista DuChene (born 1977), Canadian athlete
Krista Erickson, Canadian broadcaster
Krista Errickson (born 1964), American actress
Krista Fanedl (born 1941), Slovenian alpine skier
Krista Ford (born 1991), American football player
Krista Franklin, American statistician
Krista Griffith (born 1972), American politician
Krista Guloien (born 1980), Canadian rower
Krista Harris (died 2006), Canadian television producer
Krista Harrison (1971–1982), American murderer
Krista Hogan (born 2006), Canadian craniopagus conjoined twin
Krista Howell, Canadian politician
Krista De Jonge (born 1950), Belgian architectural historian
Krista Kelly (born 1977), Canadian model and actress
Krista Kilburn-Steveskey (born 1968), American basketball player
Krista Kilvet (1946–2009), Estonian journalist
Krista Kim, Canadian contemporary artist
Krista Lee Kinsman (born 1978), Canadian volleyball player
Krista Kiuru (born 1974), Finnish politician
Krista Kleiner (born 1989), American entertainer
Krista Kosonen (born 1983), Finnish actress
Krista Kostial-Šimonović (1923–2018), Croatian physician
Krista Kruuv (born 1971), Estonian sport sailor 
Krista Lavíčková (1917-1944), Czech secretary
Krista Lepik (born 1964), Estonian biathlete
Krista Marie, American musical artist
Krista McCarville (born 1982), Canadian curler
Krista McGee (born 1975), American author
Krista Mikkonen (born 1972), Finnish politician
Krista Mørkøre (born 1998), Faroe Islander swimmer
Krista Muir, Canadian singer
Krista R. Muis, Canadian associate professor
Krista Nell (1946–1975), Austrian film actress
Krista Ninivaggi (born 1979), American interior designer
Krista Pärmäkoski (born 1990), Finnish cross-country skier
Krista Phillips (born 1988), Canadian basketball player
Krista Pöllänen (born 1973), Finnish bowler
Krista Polvere (born 1980), Australian singer-songwriter
Krista Posch (born 1948), Italian-German television actress
Krista Ranillo (born 1982), Filipina actress
Krista Sager (born 1953), German politician
Krista Scharf (born 1982), Canadian curler
Krista Schmidinger (born 1970), American former alpine skier
Krista Siegfrids (born 1985), Finnish singer
Krista Belle Stewart, Canadian artist
Krista Tervo (born 1997), Finnish athlete
Krista Tesreau (born 1964), American actress
Krista Thompson (born 1972), Canadian field hockey goalkeeper
Krista Thompson (art historian), African college professor
Krista Tippett (born 1960), American journalist
Krista Vansant (born 1993), American volleyball player
Krista Vendy, Australian actress and model
Krista van Velzen (born 1974), Dutch politician
Krista Vernoff (born 1974), American television screenwriter
Krista Voda (born 1974), American sportscaster
Krista S. Walton, American chemical engineer
Krista Watterworth, American television actor
Krista White (born 1984), American model
Krista Woodward (born 1984), Canadian athlete
Krista Marie Yu (born 1988), American actress

Feminine given names
Estonian feminine given names
Finnish feminine given names
Swedish feminine given names
English feminine given names